Hermagoras of Amphipolis (Greek: Ἑρμαγόρας ὁ Ἀμφιπολίτης) (3rd century BC) was a Stoic philosopher, student of Cypriot Persaeus, in the court of Antigonus II Gonatas. He wrote several dialogues, among them a Misokyōn (Μισοκύων, Dog-hater, Cynic-hater); one volume On Misfortunes; Έκχυτος Ekchytos (about egg-divining); On Sophistry addressed to the Academics. None of his works are known to survive.

Notes

References
  Vol. 2
 Branham, Goulet-Cazé, (editors), The Cynics: The Cynic Movement in Antiquity and Its Legacy, p. 413

Hellenistic-era philosophers
Ancient Macedonian philosophers
Writers of lost works
Ancient Amphipolitans
Stoic philosophers
3rd-century BC philosophers
3rd-century BC Macedonians
People of Antigonid Macedonia
Cynicism